Roland Arpin (27 April 1934 – 2 September 2010) was a Canadian educator, communicator, and public administrator. He is best known as the Deputy Minister for Education, as Deputy Minister for Culture, as Director of Working Groups who report to the Government of Quebec, and as the Director General of the Musée de la civilisation.

Biography 
Arpin was born in 1934 in Montreal. He devoted several years of studies to his training as a teacher. He first obtained a certificate of higher education and then a baccalaureate in pedagogy at the University of Montreal, following the completion of a bachelor's degree from the same university. He then began his career as an teacher. He taught for 12 years, from primary to university, and then became a school administrator, progressing from Director of Personnel to the General Director at the Collège de Maisonneuve in Montreal over a five year span. From 1972 to 1975, he served as president of the Federation of General and Professional Colleges and the Centre for Research and Animation in Education.

Responsibilities 
In 1975, Roland Arpin became Deputy Minister for Planning and Budget at the Quebec Ministry of Education. He was appointed Deputy Minister of Cultural Affairs in 1980 and then-Secretary of the Conseil du trésor in 1984, placing him at the heart of government administration. Many government missions led him abroad, for instance, from 1976 to 1980, he served on the Education Commission of the OECD in Paris, where he served as vice-president for two years. In addition, he undertook many personal travels, taking him to the Middle East, Asia, Europe, and Africa.

In 1987, he was tasked with founding the Museum of Civilization in Quebec City, which opened its doors the following year. He was the institution's director until 2001.

In February 1991, the Minister of Cultural Affairs entrusted him with the responsibility of developing a draft cultural policy for Quebec. In the same year, the Direction des Musées de France asked him to elaborate a plan to revive the ailing National Museum of Folk Arts and Traditions, located in Paris.

In 2001, Roland Arpin set up the association for the 400th anniversary of Quebec City, due in 2008, of which he was the first president and general director, until 2004 when he retired aged 70 years old. Roland Arpin then said: “There was some clearing work to be done, I did it. This organisation had to be given a boost. It is done. I consider that was my mandate. The years that remain before 2008 will be years of tug-of-war between the federal, provincial and municipal governments. I don't feel like going through this. There are battles that we don't feel like fighting."

Questioned about his lasting work, the Museum of Civilization that he founded and directed in Quebec City, he concludes: “It's the synthesis of my career. It sums up my profession as an educator, my taste for quality public service and the necessary openness that we must have on the world."

He died at the age of 76, on 2 September 2010, from Parkinson's disease.

Awards and honours 
1988 – Award of Excellence for Career as Public Administrator, National School of Public Administration (ENAP and ADENAP)
1994 – Honorary Doctorate, National Institute of Scientific Research (INRS, University of Quebec)
1995 – Officer of Arts and Letters, of the French Republic
1998 – Knight of the National Order of Merit, of the French Republic
1999 – Officer of the Ordre national du Québec
2000 – Officer of the National Order of Merit, of the French Republic
2001 – Creation of the Prix Roland-Arpin, by the Musée de la civilization – intended for students of the university programs of museology of Québec
2001 – Member of the Académie des Grands Québécois
2002 – Honorary Doctorate of Letters, Université Laval

Selected publications 
 Jean-Pierre Béland et Roland Arpin, La linguistique et ses applications : initiation aux études de linguistique et de littérature, Montréal, Centre de Psychologie et de Pédagogie, 1967, 257 p., 16 cm x 23 cm
 Roland Arpin, Une école centrée sur l'essentiel, Ville Saint-Laurent, Fides, 1995 
 Roland Arpin, Des musées pour aujourd'hui, 	Québec, Musée de la Civilisation, 1997, 271 p., 23 cm 
 Roland Arpin, Le Musée de la civilisation. Une histoire d'amour, Québec et Ville Saint-Laurent, Musée de la civilisation et Fides, 1998, 175 p. 
 Roland Arpin, La Cité du 21e siècle. Le lieu de l’intelligence, Conférence, Journée thématique, Ville de Saint-Hyacinthe, le 30 mai 1998 
 Roland Arpin, Le musée entre la fonction politique et l'action politique, collection Les grandes conférences, Ville Saint-Laurent, Fides, 1999, 44 p., 18 x 13 cm 
 Groupe de travail sur la complémentarité du secteur privé dans la poursuite des objectifs fondamentaux du système de santé au Québec, présidé par M. Roland Arpin, 1999:
 La complémentarité du secteur privé dans la poursuite des objectifs fondamentaux du système public de santé au Québec : rapport du groupe de travail, 120 p. ;
 La présence du privé dans la santé au Québec : état détaillé de la situation, 48 p. ;
 Constats et recommandations sur les pistes à explorer : synthèse, 60 p. .
 Groupe-conseil sur la politique culturelle du Québec, sous la présidence de Roland Arpin, Notre patrimoine, un présent du passé, novembre 2000, XXX-240 p. Annexes (I : Curriculum vitæ des membres du Groupe-conseil ; II : Liste des organismes et des personnes rencontrées ; III : Bibliographie, Liste des documents reçus, Liste des documents consultés), photos, 17 tableaux 
 Roland Arpin, Territoires culturels, Ville Saint-Laurent, Bellarmin, collection L'essentiel, 2002, 296 p., 19 x 13 cm

References 

1934 births
2010 deaths
Canadian non-fiction writers